Linus Martin Tommy Svenning (born 13 April 1990) is a Swedish singer and songwriter who participated in Melodifestivalen 2014, the selection process for picking the Swedish entry to the Eurovision Song Contest with the song "Bröder".

He sang in the first semi-final passing to the second chance round on 1 March in Lidköping and qualified after a duel round with Martin Stenmarck's song "När änglarna går hem". The duel qualified him for the Final 10 round held on 8 March 2014 where he finished fifth overall. Despite not winning the contest, the song "Bröder" became popular with the Swedish public reaching #3 on Sverigetopplistan, the official Swedish Singles Chart immediately after the contest.

Singles

References

External links
Linus Svenning Official Website

Living people
1990 births
Swedish rock singers
Swedish pop singers
People from Svedala Municipality
21st-century Swedish singers
21st-century Swedish male singers
Melodifestivalen contestants of 2015
Melodifestivalen contestants of 2014